Deivid Washington de Souza Eugênio (born 5 June 2005), known as Deivid Washington or just Deivid, is a Brazilian professional footballer who plays as a forward for the under-20 team of Santos.

Club career
Born in Itumbiara, Goiás, Deivid first joined Grêmio as an eight years old, before moving to Santos FC three years later. It was the former Brazil international Marcos Assunção that introduced him to the club from the São Paulo state, where he started making an impression in the Campeonato Brasileiro Sub-17.

At the age of 16, Deivid signed his first professional contract with the club, reportedly including a R$ 100 million release clause, and tying him to the club for the next three years.

He also started the 2023 season as a first-choice with the under-20 team, playing in the Copa São Paulo de Futebol Júnior.

Honours
Santos
: 2022

References

2005 births
Living people
Brazilian footballers
Brazil youth international footballers
Association football forwards
Sportspeople from Goiás